Via is the debut studio album by American progressive metalcore band Volumes. It was initially released on September 27, 2011 through Mediaskare Records.

The album was re-released in 2016 independently under the 91367 Records moniker, remastered and with a new cover. However, the album's fifth track, "Serenity", originally contained a solo towards the end of the song, but it was removed from the remastered edition of the album, likely due to copyright issues relating to Chris Letchford of Scale the Summit performing the solo on the album's original edition.

Track listing

Personnel
Volumes
 Gus Farias – unclean vocals 
 Michael Barr – unclean vocals
 Diego Farias – lead guitar, programming, production, engineering, editing, mixing
 Daniel Schwartz – rhythm guitar, clean vocals, drums 
 Raad Soudani – bass

Additional musicians
 Chris Letchford of Scale the Summit – guest guitar solo on track 5

Additional personnel
 Daniel Braunstein – production, programming, engineering, editing, mixing
 Zack Ohren – mastering

Charts

References

2011 debut albums
Volumes (band) albums
Mediaskare Records albums